Suu Myat Htet (also spelt Su Myat Htet; born 22 July 1980) is a Burmese politician who currently serves as a member of parliament in the Sagaing Region Hluttaw for Sagaing Township № 2 Constituency. She is a member of the National League for Democracy.

Early life and education 
Suu Myat Htet was born on 22 July 1980 in Sagaing, Myanmar. She graduated M.Ed, B.Ed, B.A, Dip in Eng, Dip in Political Science, Master of Public Administration, from Sagaing Education College, Taungoo Education College , Sagaing Institute of Education, Monywa Institute of Economics, Meiktila Institute of Economics joint, University of Foreign Languages, Mandalay and Mandalay University. She previously worked as a headmistress of Kid's Smile Private School, Sagaing. She had served as the charge of NLD Township Youth.

Political career
In the 2015 Myanmar general election, she contested the Sagaing Region Hluttaw from Sagaing Township № 2 parliamentary constituency, winning a majority of 60,981 votes. She is currently serves as chairperson in Government guarantees, admission and commitment appraisal committee in the Sagaing Region Hluttaw and as chairwoman of the NLD women’s committee in Sagaing Township.

References

External links
 Page

National League for Democracy politicians
1980 births
Living people
People from Sagaing Region
Mandalay University alumni